The following list of fictional musteloids in animation is subsidiary to the list of fictional musteloids. This list includes weasels, ferrets, minks, skunks, otters, martens, and red pandas.

All fictional badgers are found within the list of fictional badgers.

All fictional raccoons are found within the list of fictional raccoons.

Ferrets

Martens

Minks

Skunks

Otters

Weasels

Other

References

Mustelids
Mustelids
Mustelids